Chad Michael Storbeck, known professionally as Chad Michaels (born March 20, 1971), is an American drag performer and professional Cher impersonator. He was the runner-up of the fourth season of RuPaul's Drag Race, alongside Phi Phi O'Hara, and the winner of the first season of RuPaul's Drag Race All Stars. In 2013, he released "Tragic Girl", his debut single and music video.

Early life
Michaels was born Chad Michael Storbeck to former high school football player Jerry Michael Storbeck of Aurelia, Iowa and salon worker Linda Storbeck Olson of Encinitas, California at Arcadia Methodist Hospital in Arcadia, California on March 20, 1971. His parents graduated from Pasadena High School and Aurelia High School, respectively, and wed in 1968. They resided in Olivenhain, Encinitas, California at the time of his birth before they moved to Los Angeles, and then again to San Diego, where he was raised. He originally went by the drag name "Brigitte Love." Michaels chose to perform under his own name after working at "An Evening at La Cage" in Las Vegas, which required the drag queens to use male stage names. Michaels is married to Adam Magee.

Career

RuPaul's Drag Race
In 2010, Michaels competed in the first California Entertainer of the Year pageant, becoming first alternate to winner Shangela.

In 2011, Chad was announced as one of the 13 queens competing on the fourth season of RuPaul's Drag Race in 2012. Throughout the series, Chad won two challenges, including "WTF!: Wrestling's Trashiest Fighters" as well as the annual "Snatch Game" (a parody of the Match Game) where he impersonated Cher. His performance as Cher received high praises from the judges. He made it to the final three, losing to Sharon Needles. After his run on Drag Race, Chad continued to perform as Cher.

RuPaul's Drag Race All Stars
In the same year, Chad was announced as a contestant on the first series of RuPaul's Drag Race All Stars. During the series, he teamed up with Season 1 contestant Shannel. Chad won three challenges, including the make-over challenge, and ultimately won the competition, beating Season 2 runner-up Raven in a final lipsync. This secured his spot in the Drag Race Hall of Fame. 
 
Michaels produces and performs with the Dreamgirls Revue, a female impersonation show in California. Performers in the Dreamgirls Revue have included RuPaul's Drag Race contestants Delta Work, Raven, Detox, Morgan McMichaels, Raja, Shannel, and Venus D-Lite. 

Morgan McMichaels is Michaels' drag daughter.

Michaels started touring with Farrah Moan in 2019 for the Burlesque tour, based on the Cher and Christina Aguilera movie.

Discography

Singles

Filmography

Film

Television

Music Videos

Web series

References

External links
 
 

1971 births
Living people
American drag queens
People from Los Angeles
People from San Diego
Chad Michaels